Tokyo currently sends 53 elected members to the Diet of Japan, 42 to the House of Representatives and 11 to the House of Councillors.

House of Representatives 
The current House of Representatives Tokyo delegation consists of 25 members of the LDP, 8 CDP, 3 independents, 3 Komeito, 2 JCP and 1 DPP.

District seats

PR seats 
Alongside Hokkaido, Tokyo is the only other prefecture-level division with its own proportional representation block. The PR block consists of 17 members.

House of Councillors 
The current House of Councillors Tokyo delegation consists of 4 members of the LDP, 2 CDP, 2 JCP, 2 Komeito, 1 DP and 1 independent. The members are elected from the Tokyo at-large district.

References 

Politics of Tokyo
Parliamentary districts of the Diet of Japan by prefecture
Districts of the House of Representatives (Japan)
Districts of the House of Councillors (Japan)